Hackhurst and White Downs is a  biological Site of Special Scientific Interest west of Dorking in Surrey. White Downs is  a Nature Conservation Review site, Grade 2, and part of it is in the  White Downs nature reserve, which is owned by the Wotton Estate and managed by the Surrey Wildlife Trust  (SWT). Hackhurst Downs is a  Local Nature Reserve, which part of the  Hackhurst Downs nature reserve, which is owned by Surrey County Council and also managed by the SWT.

This steeply sloping land is a shared escarpment with Ranmore Common, amounting to an almost whole section of the North Downs, which has grassland, secondary woodland and scrub. It has a rich invertebrate fauna with forty species of butterfly, including adonis blue, chalkhill blue, brown hairstreak, Duke of Burgundy fritillary, marbled white and silver-spotted skipper.

References

External links
Surrey County Council map of SSSIs

Surrey Wildlife Trust
Local Nature Reserves in Surrey
Sites of Special Scientific Interest in Surrey
Nature Conservation Review sites
Hills of Surrey